Rupasi Raate is a Bengali studio album of Bollywood playback singer Shreya Ghoshal. Released January 1, 2001, the album consists of 12 tracks, which are popular Bengali songs in her voice.

Track listing

References 

Shreya Ghoshal albums
2000 albums